A Film Johnnie is a 1914 American-made motion picture starring Charles Chaplin, Roscoe Arbuckle, and Mabel Normand.

Cast
 Charles Chaplin - The Film Johnnie
 Roscoe 'Fatty' Arbuckle - Himself
 Virginia Kirtley - The Keystone Girl
 Peggy Pearce - The Keystone Girl
 Mabel Normand - Mabel
 Ford Sterling - Himself

Plot
Charlie goes to the movies and falls in love with a pretty girl he sees on the screen. He goes to Keystone Studios to find the actress. While there, he disrupts the shooting of a film.  A fire breaks out. Charlie is blamed, gets squirted with a firehose, and is shoved by the female star.

The title of the film is a variation on the term "stage door johnnie". It was once commonly used to describe someone who regularly loitered near the actors' entrances of theaters hoping to meet the players or perhaps land a job onstage or backstage.

Reviews
A reviewer for Bioscope wrote of Chaplin and A Film Johnnie, "Another triumph for the old Karno comedian. Knockabout of an extraordinary character. An extra special comedy."

A reviewer for Moving Picture World wrote, "Edgar English's [Chaplin's] work in this picture will keep it amusing."

A reviewer for The Cinema wrote, "The sensation of the year is the success of Chas. Chaplin...One of his films is A Film Johnny [sic] which shows how his admiration of a film beauty led to a commotion in a cinema and finally took him to the Keystone Studio--and a job. All the Keystone heads are in this [film] and it is packed with indescribably funny incidents."

See also
 List of American films of 1914
 Charlie Chaplin filmography
 Fatty Arbuckle filmography

External links

1914 films
1914 comedy films
American black-and-white films
American silent short films
Films directed by George Nichols
Silent American comedy films
Films produced by Mack Sennett
1914 short films
Articles containing video clips
American comedy short films
1910s American films